Link's memorandum is a group of three letters written by American oil geologist Walter K. Link after accepting an invitation to establish an onshore exploration program in 1954, for Petrobras, the Brazilian petroleum monopoly. After having completed his six-year contract, his detailed evaluation recommended that Petrobras look offshore instead. This recommendation did not go well with either Petrobras, or the local press, in which he was "vilified mercilessly as the messenger with bad news".

After ignoring Link's advice for the following seven years, Petrobras finally did accept, and act upon, the recommendation.

References 

Petrobras